Sylvanus Marshall Apps III (born June 2, 1976) is an American former professional minor league ice hockey player, the grandson of Toronto Maple Leafs captain Syl Apps and the son of Pittsburgh Penguins player Syl Apps Jr.

Playing career
As a teenager, he was coached by Brian Conacher, son of Toronto Maple Leafs legend Lionel Conacher at Upper Canada College. Before playing for the Princeton Tigers, Apps played for the St. Michael's Buzzers in 1994-95.

Princeton
Apps III was a four-time letter winner at Princeton. In addition, he was captain of the Princeton Tigers during the 1998–99 season. As of the 2009–10 Princeton season, Apps is 35th on the Tigers all-time scoring list. For his career, Apps played in 122 games, scored 30 goals and registered 41 assists for a career total of 71. Apps ranks 11th in most games played in a career at Princeton, while he is tied for second overall in most postseason games played in a career with 19. On March 21, 1998, Apps scored the game-winning goal that ended the third longest Princeton game. The game lasted 80:48, and Princeton defeated Clarkson by a score of 5-4 to claim the ECAC Championship.

Professional
On July 22, 1999, Apps was signed as a Free Agent by the Toronto Maple Leafs. Apps played in the American Hockey League with the
St. John's Maple Leafs, Norfolk Admirals, and Springfield Falcons. He also played in the ECHL with the Jackson Bandits, and the Trenton Titans. As a member of the Trenton Titans, Apps was the team captain.

Personal
His sister Gillian Apps won gold medals with the Canadian Olympic women's ice hockey teams in 2006 and 2010. His other sister, Amy Apps, was a member of the Canadian National women's Soccer team and an OUA All Star in  1998 and 1999. His cousin, Darren Barber, won a gold medal in coxed eights at the 1992 Summer Olympics in Barcelona, as a member of the Canadian team. Barber also competed at the 1996 Summer Olympics in Atlanta, where he finished fourth.

Apps lives in the Toronto area and works as Managing Director with Hines in Toronto.

Career statistics

Awards and honours

References

External links
 

1976 births
American men's ice hockey centers
Canadian ice hockey centres
Ice hockey people from Pittsburgh
Jackson Bandits players
Living people
Norfolk Admirals players
Princeton Tigers men's ice hockey players
Springfield Falcons players
St. John's Maple Leafs players
Trenton Titans players
Upper Canada College alumni